Carlos Miguel Álvarez (born 5 May 1943) is an Argentine former cyclist. He competed at the 1968 Summer Olympics and the 1972 Summer Olympics.

References

External links
 

1943 births
Living people
Argentine male cyclists
Olympic cyclists of Argentina
Cyclists at the 1968 Summer Olympics
Cyclists at the 1972 Summer Olympics
Sportspeople from La Plata
Pan American Games medalists in cycling
Pan American Games gold medalists for Argentina
Pan American Games bronze medalists for Argentina
Cyclists at the 1967 Pan American Games
Cyclists at the 1979 Pan American Games